Tight may refer to:

Clothing 
 Skin-tight garment, a garment that is held to the skin by elastic tension
 Tights, a type of leg coverings fabric extending from the waist to feet
 Tightlacing, the practice of wearing a tightly-laced corset
 ”Tighties”, a slang term for tight cycling shorts. 
 “Tighty-whiteys”, American slang for men’s or boys’ briefs

Mathematics 
 Tight frame, a mathematical term defining the bounding conditions of a vector space
 Tightness of measures, a concept in measure (and probability) theory

Music 
 Tight (Mindless Self Indulgence album), 1999
 Tight (Hank Crawford album), 1996
 "Tight" (song), a song by INXS
 "Tight", a song by The Coup from their 2001 album Party Music

Science and technology 
 Tight gas, natural gas which is difficult to access
 Tight oil, shale oil which is difficult to access
 American car racing term for when the car is understeering

Slang 
 Miser
 Drunkenness
 Cool (aesthetic)
 Close-knit

Other uses
 High and tight, a hairstyle typical in the U.S. military
 Tight end, an offensive position in American football
 Tight playing style, a poker strategy

See also
 Tight rope (disambiguation)
 Tightness (disambiguation)